Vriesea drepanocarpa is a species of flowering plant in the Bromeliaceae family. It is endemic to Brazil.

References

drepanocarpa
Flora of Brazil
Taxa named by Carl Christian Mez
Taxa named by John Gilbert Baker